James Testro (6 August 1851 – 30 April 1934) was a New Zealand cricketer who played nine first-class matches for the Auckland in the 1880s.

See also
 List of Auckland representative cricketers

References

External links

1851 births
1934 deaths
New Zealand cricketers
Auckland cricketers
Wicket-keepers